Ukonga is an administrative ward in the Ilala District of the Dar es Salaam Region of Tanzania with postal code number 12107. According to the 2002 census, the ward has a total population of 75,014. Its name was first mentioned in a book by a German missionary during the late nineteenth century making it one of the handful oldest known suburbs of Dar es Salaam city; in that book, it was said that Ukonga had plenty of coconut and mango trees something which could be seen as soon as in 1980s (in fact there is a well known place, in Ukonga, known as "Mwembe-Madafu" which literally translates to Mango-Coconut place).

References

Ilala District
Wards of Dar es Salaam Region